Dov Ber Abramowitz (1860 – 1926) was an American Orthodox Rabbi and author.

Born in Vabalninkas, Lithuania, he moved with his family to Jerusalem in 1870, at the age of ten. After being ordained by Rabbi Shmuel Salant, he served as a district rabbi in Jerusalem. In 1894, he immigrated to the United States. A few years later he was appointed as the chief dayyin of St. Louis. He was one of the founders of  the Aggudath Harabbinim. He formed the first branch of Mizrachi in the United States in St. Louis and served as president of the American Mizrachi.

He died in Jerusalem, Mandate Palestine. His grandson was Abraham Leon Sachar.

Name
The Yiddish name דוב-בער Dov-Ber literally means "bear-bear", traceable back to the Hebrew word דב dov "bear" and the German word Bär "bear". It is thus an example of a bilingual tautological name.

References

Goldman, Yosef. Hebrew Printing in America, 1735-1926, A History and Annotated Bibliography (YGBooks 2006). .

Haredi rabbis in Israel
American Haredi rabbis
1860 births
1926 deaths
Clergy from St. Louis
People from Vabalninkas